Angelica Garcia (born May 21, 1972, in El Monte, California) is a former Latin pop singer. Her uncle is Eusebio Garcia, director of Mariachi Toluca. She won the "Best New Artist" award at the Mexican national contest, Juguemos a Cantar, and spent two years acting on the variety program La Hora Feliz. The title track of her debut album, Angel Baby (a cover of a Rosie and the Originals song), was a hit in America, peaking on the Billboard Hot 100 in 1991 at No. 29. She never had another US hit, but her 1997 Spanish-language single "Vaya" was a hit in Central and South America.

Garcia obtained a bachelor's degree in applied design from The University of Maryland East Shore, and now works at the Jubilee Consortium, a nonprofit. She is the mother of singer-songwriter, Angelica Garcia.

Discography
Angel Baby (Ultra Records, 1991) US Billboard Heatseekers peak No. 37
Angelica (Atlantic Records, 1997)

References

1972 births
Singers from California
Living people
People from El Monte, California
21st-century American singers